Nasaan Ka Elisa? (lit. Where Are You, Elisa?) is a Philippine crime drama television series on ABS-CBN. The show aired from September 12, 2011 to January 13, 2012, replacing SNN: Showbiz News Ngayon. It is the Philippine adaptation of the 2009 Chilean telenovela ¿Dónde está Elisa? (later remade in the United States in 2010), starring Melissa Ricks.

List of Episodes

References

Lists of Philippine drama television series episodes